Swan Township is one of thirteen townships in Noble County, Indiana. As of the 2010 census, its population was 2,399 and it contained 965 housing units.

Geography

Unincorporated towns
 Ari at 
 Ege at 
 LaOtto at 
 Swan at 
(This list is based on USGS data and may include former settlements.)

References

External links
 Indiana Township Association
 United Township Association of Indiana

Townships in Noble County, Indiana
Townships in Indiana